No. 24 Squadron Royal New Zealand Air Force was a fighter squadron. Formed in September 1944, it was equipped with Vought F4U-1 Corsair fighter bombers.

History
24 Squadron was deployed to Piva Airfield on Bougainville from December 1944-January 1945 then to Palikulo Bay Airfield on Espiritu Santo. 24 Squadron deployed to Green Island from March–May 1945, to Bougainville from July–October 1945 and then to Santo from October 1945 where it was disbanded.

Commanding officers
Squadron Leader M. T. Vanderpump October 1944-January 1945; 
Squadron Leader A. G. S. George February–October 1945.

Notes

References

24
Military units and formations established in 1944
Military units and formations disestablished in 1945
Squadrons of the RNZAF in World War II